Chickenfeed (2006) is a crime novella by English writer Minette Walters, published as part of the "Quick Reads", designed to promote literacy through short, simply written and fast moving stories.

Synopsis
Based on the real life case of Elsie Cameron, a woman whose body was dismembered by her fiancé, Norman Thorne, who was hanged for her murder in 1924. Walters re-creates the events leading up to the crime and writes from the perspective of both Elsie and Norman, as their relationship slowly turns sour and Norman yearns to be free from Elsie.

References

External links 
More about Chickenfeed on Walters' website
Agent's dedicated page

2006 British novels
Novels by Minette Walters
British novellas
Fiction set in 1924
Pan Books books